Menachem Oren (born Mieczysław Chwojnik; ; 1903 – December 1962) was a Polish-born Israeli chess player and mathematician.

Chwojnik was the strongest Cracovian chess player in 1920s, a thrice winner of the Cracow championship (1919, 1925, 1926). He won the Nowy Dziennik tournament in Cracow in 1926.

He played in two Polish championships. In 1926, he tied for 8-9th places in the in Warsaw (first Polish championship). The event was won by Dawid Przepiórka. In 1927, he tied for 5-7th in Łódź. The event was won by Akiba Rubinstein. In 1928, he represented Poland on fourth board at the 2nd Chess Olympiad in The Hague (+4 –3 =4), and won the team bronze medal.

He left Cracow for Rivne, Volhynia (then Poland), in the 1930s. He won in the Rivne City championship in 1938. During World War II, he lived in the Soviet Union. After the war, he returned to Poland in 1945/46, and settled in Lower Silesia.

In 1949, Chwojnik emigrated, via Czechoslovakia and Austria, to Israel, where he had changed name to Menachem Oren. In 1951, he won the Israeli championship and the Tel Aviv City championship. In 1952, he won again the Tel Aviv City championship.

He played thrice for Israel in Chess Olympiads: on board two (+6 –4 =3) at Helsinki 1952, board three(+7 –2 =3) at Amsterdam 1954, and board four (+2 –2 =4) at Moscow 1956.

References

External links 
 
 Menachem Oren games at 365Chess.com

1903 births
1962 deaths
Jews from Galicia (Eastern Europe)
Chess Olympiad competitors
Polish chess players
Israeli chess players
Israeli mathematicians
Jewish chess players
Polish emigrants to Israel
20th-century Israeli Jews
People from Pruzhany District
20th-century chess players
Date of birth missing
Date of death missing